Mike Cerrone (born June 9, 1957) is an American actor and screenwriter from Rhode Island. He has frequently worked with the Farrelly brothers.

Filmography
Outside Providence – Actor
Me, Myself and Irene – Co-Writer (with Peter Farrelly and Bobby Farrelly)  
 Homie Spumoni - Director, Co-Writer (with Steve Cerrone and Glenn Ciano
The Three Stooges Co-Writer (with Bobby Farrelly and Peter Farrelly)
Dumb and Dumber To - Co-Writer (with Sean Anders, John Morris, Peter Farrelly, Bobby Farrelly, and Bennet Yellin, Based on characters created by Bennet Yellin, Peter Farrelly, and Bobby Farrelly)

Family
Cerrone's brother Steve Cerrone has intermittently worked as his writing Partner. Another brother Alfred Cerrone, is a GM Dealership owner in Attleboro, Massachusetts, which was the inspiration for Cavvich's character as a used car salesman in Outside Providence. The audio for one of Alfred Cerrone's actual television advertisements for his business can be heard in a scene in There's Something About Mary and also in a scene in The Three Stooges and in fever pitch credits. Cerrone has two children, Kristina and Mikey C. Jr.

References

External links

1957 births
Male actors from Rhode Island
Living people
American male screenwriters